Inhale/Exhale  may refer to:

 Inhale/Exhale (Nasum album)
 Inhale/Exhale (Random Hand album)

See also
Inhale Exhale, a Christian metalcore band